Andrea Carol Arpaci-Dusseau (also published as Andrea Dusseau) is an American computer scientist interested in operating systems, file systems, data storage, distributed computing, and computer science education. She is a professor of computer sciences at the University of Wisconsin–Madison.

Education and career
Arpaci-Dusseau majored in computer engineering at Carnegie Mellon University, graduating in 1991. She completed a Ph.D. in computer science at the University of California, Berkeley in 1998; her dissertation, Implicit Coscheduling: Coordinated Scheduling with Implicit Information in Distributed Systems, was supervised by David Culler.

After postdoctoral research at Stanford University, she joined the University of Wisconsin–Madison faculty as an assistant professor in 2000, and became a full professor there in 2009.

Personal life
Arpaci-Dusseau is married to Remzi Arpaci-Dusseau, also a professor at the University of Wisconsin–Madison and an expert on data storage; they are frequent collaborators.

Book
With Remzi Arpaci-Dusseau, Arpaci-Dusseau is the co-author of the free 2018 book Operating Systems: Three Easy Pieces.

Recognition
In 2018, Arpaci-Dusseau and her husband were the winners of the SIGOPS Mark Weiser Award, "for outstanding leadership, innovation, and impact in storage and computer systems research". Arpaci-Dusseau was named a 2020 ACM Fellow "for contributions to storage and computer systems".

References

External links
Home page

Year of birth missing (living people)
Living people
American women computer scientists
American computer scientists
Carnegie Mellon University alumni
UC Berkeley College of Engineering alumni
University of Wisconsin–Madison faculty